Edith Pattou is an American writer of fantasy fiction, including the novel East, an ALA Top Ten Best Book for Young Adults for 2004. She was born in Evanston, Illinois, and she graduated from the Francis W. Parker School, Scripps College (B.A., English), Claremont Graduate School (M.A., English) and UCLA (M.L.I.S.). She is married to Charles Emery, a professor of psychology at Ohio State University. They have one child, a daughter.

Bibliography

Songs of Eirren
 Hero's Song (Harcourt Brace Jovanovich, 1991)
 Fire Arrow: the second song of Eirren (Harcourt Brace, 1998)

East/West 
1. East (Harcourt, 2003); UK title, North Child

2. West (2018), sequel to East

Other works
 Mrs. Spitzer's Garden (2001), picture book illustrated by Tricia Tusa
 Ghosting (2014)

Awards and honors

East 
Rebecca Caudill Young Readers' Book Award Nominee (2008) 

National Public Radio Best in Young Adult Fiction finalist (2012)

References

External links
    Edith Pattou's website
 
 

20th-century American novelists
21st-century American novelists
American fantasy writers
American young adult novelists
American women novelists
Scripps College alumni
Year of birth missing (living people)
Living people
 Francis W. Parker School (Chicago) alumni
Claremont Graduate University alumni
University of California, Los Angeles alumni
Women science fiction and fantasy writers
20th-century American women writers
21st-century American women writers
Women writers of young adult literature